KNIH (970 AM) is a radio station licensed to Paradise, Nevada and serves the Las Vegas Valley.  The station is owned and operated by Relevant Radio, Inc. and broadcasts a Roman Catholic religious radio format, including call-in shows, discussions and broadcasts of the Catholic mass.  The call letters refer to Nevada Immaculate Heart.

The station broadcasts at 5000 watts by day.  But to avoid interfering with other stations on AM 970, it reduces power at night to 500 watts.  The transmitter is located off South Rainbow Boulevard near West Landberg Avenue in Las Vegas.

History

Early years
On February 21, 1962, the station first signed on the air as KVEG for "Las VEGas."  It started as a daytime only radio station, powered at just 500 watts and signing off each day at sunset.  In the 1980s, the station was authorized to broadcast around the clock, using a directional antenna at all times and increasing daytime power to 5000 watts.

Originally an affiliate with the CBS Radio Network, the station was also affiliated with the ABC and CNN Radio news networks.  For a time, the station broadcast an all-news radio format between 6 AM and Sunset every weekday, using the call letters KNUU.

As business talk

The station previously carried a business talk format. The syndicated wake up show "Imus in the Morning" started the morning drive time line up from 3am to 9am along with local news, traffic and weather with Andy Vierra. International and national news came from the ABC and CNN newscasts.  Other featured personalities included Ray Lucia, and Phil Grande.

KNIH was previously owned by the Blue Star Media Group Inc. The company owns the Business Talk Radio Network and the Lifestyle Talk Radio Network.

On November 30, 2012, AM 970 was sold to Immaculate Heart Radio's IHR Educational Broadcasting for $950,000. The call sign was changed from KNUU to KNIH on December 14, 2012. KNIH flipped to the Relevant Radio branding when IHR Educational Broadcasting and Starboard Media Foundation consummated their merger on June 30, 2017.

References

External links

NIH
NIH
Radio stations established in 1962
1962 establishments in Nevada
Relevant Radio stations
NIH
Catholic Church in Nevada